Working!!, released in English territories as Wagnaria!!, is a Japanese four-panel comic strip manga series written and illustrated by Karino Takatsu, which follows the activities of the unusual employees at one of the units of the Wagnaria family restaurant chain. The series was serialized in Square Enix's Young Gangan seinen manga magazine between January 2005 and November 2014. Square Enix released three drama CDs between 2007 and 2009 with scripts written by Shōgo Mukai. An anime television series was produced by A-1 Pictures and directed by Yoshimasa Hiraike, airing in three seasons in 2010, 2011, and 2015, respectively. In North America, the first two anime seasons are licensed by NIS America while the third is licensed by Aniplex of America.

The series is a spin-off of an earlier webcomic also titled Working!!, later published in print form as Web-ban Working!!, set in another Wagnaria restaurant and following a different group of characters. It was adapted into an anime series titled WWW.Working!! in 2016. It is licensed by Aniplex of America.

Characters

Main series

Wagnaria employees
 
 
 The main character of Working!!, Sōta is a 16-year-old high school student who was recruited to work at the family restaurant Wagnaria by Popura. He is enamored by small and cute things, and thus favors Popura over the other employees due to her cute appearance. He occasionally voices his thoughts out loud and so offends his co-workers, who punish him in various ways. He was able to adapt quickly to his job at the restaurant and although he usually finds his co-workers and the rules of the restaurant to be strange, but he still has an attachment to his job. Sōta lives with his four sisters (three older and one younger). He expresses a dislike of older women, brought about by his treatment at the hands of his older sisters. His younger sister, who is in elementary school and is almost as tall as he is, respects him.
 Despite his problems, he is occasionally forced to cross-dress as a girl named  (derived from the first two kanji in his surname). Even though he constantly gets hit by Mahiru, he is actually quite skilled in fighting, as his sister taught him self-defense. He does not fight back against Mahiru because his sisters taught him not to hit girls.
 
  
 Popura is a short 17-year-old high school student who works at Wagnaria. Ironically, she was named after the poplar tree, so that she would grow tall. She is very sensitive about her short stature, and many customers believe her to be younger than she really is. Similarly, Sōta, who is one year younger than her, usually regards her as an elementary school student. She is also unable to properly call him by his surname, saying "Katanashi" rather than "Takanashi", even when corrected. She admires Kotori, Sōta's cross-dressing persona, and the Takanashi sisters because of their tall and mature look. She is a hard worker, but she sometimes makes clumsy mistakes in her job. Despite that, she is chosen to replace Yachiyo as chief of staff near the end of the series.
 
 
 Mahiru is a timid, 17-year-old girl who works at Wagnaria. She has androphobia and is thus terrified of men; she punches any male that comes near her. This violent behavior was revealed to have arisen from childhood, when her father, who did not want his daughter to eventually marry, told her that every man is ready to attack her and conditioned her to violently attack men at a moment's notice due to this fear. As she and Sōta usually share shifts, he takes the brunt of her attacks. However, she makes considerable progress with her fear of men by taking it out on Sōta. She wears a hairpin in her hair, which she changes every day after Sōta complimented it (according to Sōma).
At first she begins to develop a crush on, and later falls in love with Sōta after he confronts her father (as Kotori) about her androphobia. With Sōta's help, over time her condition improves, and she is able to come within  of a guy without having the urge to hit them. Nevertheless, Sōta can only get closer to Mahiru without the risk of being attacked when he crossdresses as Kotori or by using a grabber toy.
 
  
 Kyōko is the manager of Wagnaria. She usually maintains a rather apathetic attitude towards the restaurant she runs and almost never bothers to do any work herself. Instead, she is seen constantly eating food such as Yachiyo's parfaits and Otoo's souvenirs. She is not beyond using violence to deal with unruly customers and firmly believes that employees come before the customers. She is 28 years old, but she becomes despondent whenever she is called old or any variation thereof. Kyōko used to be a juvenile delinquent and she met Yachiyo when she saved her from bullies when she was a little girl and demanded food as payment.
 
  
 Yachiyo is the 20-year-old chief of staff of Wagnaria. She usually carries around a katana which, according to her, was made by her parents who used to be blacksmiths. Yachiyo is unaware that some of the customers, and even Sōta, are intimidated by her blade. Sōta often addresses her as "Chief". She admires Kyōko considerably since she once saved her from bullies as a child and has followed her ever since. She constantly makes parfaits for Kyōko and becomes hostile to anyone else giving her food. Yachiyo is very close to Jun, as she has worked with him the longest and considers him to be her closest friend, but is unaware of his feelings for her and spends most of her time talking to him about Kyōko, much to his dismay, but unaware that she usually talks about him to her.
 Later in the series, she reciprocates his feelings and they begin dating, eventually appointing Popura to replace her as chief of staff. In the crossover drama CD bundled with the Servant × Service limited edition Blu-ray/DVDs, she and Jun go together to enter their names into the family register, and instead of babbling about Kyoko to others, she now boasts about her husband, Jun.
 
  
 Jun is a helpful but intimidating 20-year-old chef who works in the kitchen. He is in love with Yachiyo, but has problems expressing it. However, because she is so devoted to Kyōko, she fails to recognize any of his hints. He likes to take out his anger on Popura, by messing with her or bending the truth, which Popura naively believes. Whenever Hiroomi tries to help Jun progress with Yachiyo, Jun unrelentingly hits him with a pan, showing that he is sensitive about his feelings for Yachiyo. However, later on in the manga, Yachiyo reciprocates his feelings, and they begin dating.
 In the crossover drama CD bundled with the Servant x Service limited edition Blu-ray/DVDs, she and Jun go together to enter their names into the family register, and after the process is completed, Jun refuses to stop bullying Popura by changing her hairstyle, saying that he is too happy being a newlywed man.
 
  
 Another chef who works in the kitchen, Hiroomi is a young man with an easygoing attitude. He often blackmails the other workers to do his job for him and passes it off as a form of modesty from the other employees. He can blackmail anyone, except for Jun and Mahiru; the former usually responds to his blackmail with hitting him with a frying pan, while the latter punches him even before he talks to her. He is terrified of Mahiru's urges and is thankful for Sōta's existence in the restaurant since she takes out all her urges on him instead.
 His biggest weakness appears to be crying girls. Moreover, Aoi has been the only person on whom his blackmail attempt backfired, leaving him depressed. However, he somewhat dotes on Aoi, trying to protect her whereabouts from her brother and buying her a stuffed bear named Daisy which becomes Aoi's most beloved possession.
 
 
 Aoi is a mysterious self-proclaimed 16-year-old girl whom Otoo meets on his travels to find his missing wife. Her true identity and age are a mystery, besides the fact that her first name is 'Aoi'. He brings her back to Wagnaria, where she starts working as a waitress, and lives in the attic. While she has great confidence in herself, during work she is an unhelpful troublemaker who gets yelled at by the other staff members, especially Sōta. Since she is in training, her position among the staff is low, which she complains about. She is bad with dealing with Sōta's constant complaints about her, but she does write down some of his suggestions (along with idle complaints). She is obsessed with the idea of having a family, especially regarding Otoo whom she sees as an ideal father figure. She goes as far as to apply to be adopted by him. She is also rather childish and does not like to be (in her view) "left out" of what the others are doing. For example she asks Kyōko to drive her home (even though she "lives" at Wagnaria) and asks Sōma to poke her, since he and Satō had poked Inami and Popura. Her favorite food is nattō. Her lady-like manner and lack of knowledge in the kitchen makes Takanashi suspect she is actually from a rich family.
 Later in the series, her brother, Kirio, appears looking for her, but Sōma prevents them from meeting. When the two eventually do meet, Aoi reveals that she ran away partly due to her family situation: her father had died and her mother is described as 'robotic', but largely because Kirio had eaten the nattō she had been saving in the fridge. In the crossover drama CD bundled with the Servant x Service limited edition Blu-ray/DVDs, she wears the same school uniform as Touko Ichimiya, indicating that they attend the same school.
 
 
 Otoo is the founder of the restaurant. He is away most of the time, searching for his missing wife, who apparently is so bad with directions that she got lost while running errands and is now wandering Japan. He periodically returns to Wagnaria to check up on things and bring back souvenirs. Due to his habit of bringing food back for Kyōko whenever he returns, his life is constantly in danger from a jealous Yachiyo. He is noted to have a light presence, and is even compared to (and named) "air" by Sōta, when the latter is attempting to convince Mahiru not to attack him. He finally reunites with his wife, and they live together once again. He keeps a very close watch on her so that she will not get lost again.
 
 
 Maya is an 18-year-old girl who works at Wagnaria and wears glasses. She professes that she is a "normal person" striving to be completely ordinary in work and life in general. She has a hard time understanding the other employees, seeing how awkward all of them are, and tries not to be too familiar with them. The irony is that because she tries too hard to be "normal", she ends up being pretty weird herself. Maya briefly appeared in volume one of the manga and did not resurface until volume five due to readers requesting more information on her from the author.

Takanashi family
 
 Voiced by: Mabuki Andou (drama CD), Ryoko Shiraishi (anime)
 Kazue is the eldest sister at age 31. The tallest in the family, she works as a lawyer, is divorced, and first appeared in chapter 25. She is an expert in the law, and often uses it to her benefit in arguments in combination with violence and wordplay. She appears to be very serious, but this is just a cover for her emotional problems. She often ignores Sōta's viewpoints and appears to not get along with Izumi or Kozue, though she does care for her family. She worries when Izumi leaves the house and spoils Nazuna. She divorced her husband and childhood friend Tōru Minegishi because of his masochistic tendencies.
 
 Voiced by: Fumiko Orikasa (drama CD), Yōko Hikasa (anime) 
 Izumi is the second sister in the Takanashi family at age 28. Tall and slender, she is rarely shown standing and pays little attention to her bedraggled appearance (always dressing in black, not wearing make-up, and being covered in ink). She writes romance novels for a living. Though she loves her job, she is often driven to despair by deadlines and writer's block, and often locks herself in her messy room. Izumi has a weak constitution—she gets muscle aches from carrying anything heavier than a pen—and frequently relies on others to take care of her, doing no household chores and being cared for by her brother.
 
 Voiced by: Akiko Kimura (drama CD), Shizuka Itō (anime)
 Kozue is the third sister at age 25. Slightly shorter than Kazue, she is an aikido instructor, and appears in chapter 20 of the manga. She is often found passed out by the front door. She loves to go to Wagnaria and latch on to any employees (especially Mahiru). Sōta has a hard time dealing with her as she loves to wear revealing clothing. She gets lonely easily and loves to pick up guys, but soon breaks up with them, a contributing factor to her alcohol abuse. She loves Sōta, but goes about it the wrong way, resulting in him treating her more harshly than her sisters. Due to her job, she is the only person who can withstand Kazue's physical attacks.
 
 , Momoko Saitō (anime) 
 Nazuna is the fourth sister and the youngest member in the Takanashi family at age 12. Though still in elementary school, she is almost as tall as Sōta. Nazuna first appears in chapter 25 of the manga. When she was little, she saw how her sisters abused Sōta and decided to protect her brother. Only Izumi is spared from her discrete machinations against her unsuspecting sisters. However, Sōta worries that she will grow up to be a worse sadist than her sisters.
 Being still in elementary school, her lack of stamina makes it harder for her to stay up late at night. After assuming that Inami is Sōta's girlfriend, Nazuna uses a school report assignment as an excuse and bribes the manager to help out at the restaurant. Later in the series, she helps out once in a while and appears to work without pay.
 
  
 Shizuka is the widowed matriarch of the Takanashi family and a politician who barely appears at home due to work. She finally reveals herself in the final arc of the manga and in the last episode of the anime series. Shizuka is a manipulative and headstrong woman and the simple mention of her name is enough to have her children intimidated, except for Nazuna, who seems to have not known her enough yet. She used to have a petite and weak physique when she was small, but when her future husband claimed that he preferred taller women, she trained her body to be big and strong as well, much to her dismay when she learned that he was lying, as he used to have a liking for small and cute things, just like Sōta, but was too ashamed to admit at the time. Because of that, and also because her husband also had failed in his promise to "not die" according to her, that she claims that she hates liars, and thus she decides to meddle with Sōta and Mahiru's relationship in order to have them admit their true feelings for each other.

Others
 
 
 Name unspecified, loves his daughter to the point of making up lies about males so that no boys would come near her. Out of jealousy, he told Mahiru that all men wanted to attack her so that she would fear them and never get married. He is the cause of Mahiru's androphobia and abnormal strength, having subtly trained her from birth, though this has also made him a target for her punching. Due to the possibility of getting hit at home, he lives and works by himself faraway, almost forgetting what Mahiru looks like. He appears to be calm and normal, but carries a rifle with him which he intends to use on boys who get too close to Mahiru.
 
 
 Name unspecified. She does not appear to interfere with her husband's upbringing of their daughter.
 
 
 Otoo's wife, who went shopping one day for some milk, but due to her terrible sense of direction, has since been unable to find her way back home. She has occasionally run into other members of the Wagnaria staff, but often mysteriously disappears soon afterwards. In reality, she navigates her way through the sewers, only stopping for milk at convenience stores, explaining why she and Otoo never cross paths.
 
 
One of the members of Kyōko's old personal gang, who occasionally gets called in to help at the restaurant when staff are low. He is distinguished by his green jumpsuit, ponytail, and snaggle-tooth. Yōhei is unemployed, a status which he does not change in order to ensure he is always available should Kyōko need his help. When he remarks that Kozue is pretty (shortly after she is dumped by her latest boyfriend), she develops a persistent interest in him because he rejects her on the grounds of not being able to provide for her given his unemployment rather than because he dislikes her. He does not get along with his twin sister, Mitsuki.
 
 
Yōhei's twin sister, and another member of Kyōko's old gang. She is currently working as an insurance agent and is easily embarrassed by her past looks. She presently wears red business attire and brown hair, though she used to have puffy blonde-dyed hair and yankee schoolgirl attire. Like her brother, she is more than willing to avail herself to Kyoko should her leader call for her help. Mitsuki is also highly protective of Yachiyo, developing a dislike of Jun as a result of his romantic interest in Yachiyo as well as his correct assertion that Mitsuki's attitude towards Yachiyo is the reason why Yachiyo has not become self-sufficient.
 
 
 Aoi's older brother who has been constantly searching for her. He shares his sister's eyes, dark purple hair and irises, and wears a white school uniform. Like Aoi, his surname is an alias which coincidentally matches hers. He is the captain of a karate club and is strong enough to defend himself against Mahiru, who he gains a crush on.
 
 
 Kazue's ex-husband and childhood friend who works for Shizuka. Because of his constant masochistic tendencies, Kazue divorced him, although it has been hinted that she still has feelings for him (since he still blatantly loves her).
 
 
 Izumi's novel editor who has to constantly deal with late entries from Izumi. She is seen late in the series when Izumi has to deal with Sōta realizing his feelings for Mahiru, which she believes will tear the family apart.

WWW.Working!!

Wagnaria employees
 
 
The main protagonist, a high school freshman who takes a part-time job at Wagnaria. He does not want to work, but is forced to take on a part-time job to pay for his personal costs after his father's business went bankrupt. He is an easily annoyed teenager, specifically towards his carefree family and towards Miyakoshi's attempts at feeding him chocolate which always end on a disastrous note.
 
 
A high school student. She tends to be strict and somewhat unfazed at the strange behavior of her co-workers, except when they fail to do their jobs properly. Hana tends to punch the manager in the face and encourages Higashida to do the same so he does not become as miserable as the manager. Despite being rough on the exterior, she can quickly change her personality to look friendlier (albeit to customers only). She enjoys making chocolates, although they are terrible enough to make people "meet Saint Valentine from down the Heavens".
 
 
A girl who shows little expression. For reasons first unknown, she serves an invisible "elder customer" despite the fact she claims to not believe in ghosts, making the issue even more confusing. However, it is eventually revealed she can see ghosts as she comes from a family of exorcists, but she simply refuses to believe in such phenomena. She rarely smiles and is said to leave "questionable reactions" on people who see it, with Adachi as one of the few witnesses.
 
 
One of the cooks, he has black hair tied in a small ponytail. After he witnesses Sayuri smiling at him, he "suffers" from a fast heart beat everytime he sees her, and mistakes it as a curse.
 
 
A university student. She behaves and acts like a delinquent and does very little work. When people reprimand her for her conduct, she retorts with trivia questions that are normally left unanswered. Higashida is one of the few people able to respond to her trivia questions, leaving her surprised. She has a daughter whom she usually leaves with her mother who dotes on her granddaughter too much, and just like her mother, seems to be smart.
 
 
The daughter of a large company, who is always seen with a smile in her face. Seemingly spoiled, arrogant and materialistic, Shiho refers to the people as the "common masses" and often attempts to bribe people with money as her "apology". She has known Shindō since childhood and was rejected by him at some point, which he attributes as the reason of her working despite being economically rich. She frequently bullies and mistreats Shindō due to his previous rejection, using the fact that his father is debt with her father's company as leverage to torment him, despite the fact that she is very much still in love with him, but is unable to express it properly.
 
 , Ayaka Suwa (young, anime)
The son of a man whose business is in debt, so he works in several jobs including delivering newspapers and being a host in order to pay the debt, making his situation somewhat similar to Higashida. He considers the job at Wagnaria the most important since he gets leftovers for free. His father's business is a Butcher's Shop whose display is rather gruesome. Shindō and Shiho have known each other since childhood and he rejected her, the event caused her to subsequently torment him as his father is debt with her father's company and she uses this situation as leverage. He's very much oblivious to Shiho's lingering feelings for him, which causes her to bully him even further out of frustration.
 
 
One of the cooks, he has short blond hair and gets along with Adachi. Even though it's a waitress' job, Takuya is the one who makes parfait in the restaurant, thanks to Miyakoshi's terrifying cooking skills.
 
 
 Kōki is the newest employee at Wagnaria. Even though his parents are Japanese, he was raised abroad and initially does not speak Japanese, so he has Kisaki teach him even though he sometimes incorrectly pronounces words in Japanese.
 
 
The manager of Wagnaria. Despite being the manager, he seems to lack actual education as he is unaware of how to write certain words properly or even resolve easy calculations without a calculator and even then fails.

Others
 
 
 Higashida's classmate who never comes to school due to her illness. Is the grand-daughter of the "elderly customer" only Muranashi can see.
 
 
 Higashida's classmate who has a crush on him but misunderstands things easily.
 
 
 Hana's mother who is ironically a cooking expert despite of her daughter's terrifying cooking skill, although she seems to be 'clumsy' as well. Because of her husband's habit eating everything she cooks, he was diagnosed with diabetes, forced him to living separately until his blood glucose's level has dropped. Despite everything she says about her husband, she's totally in love with him.
 
 
 One of Shiho's bodyguards. Even though he is Shiho's "bodyguard", he is actually tasked by Shiho's father to prevent Shiho's sadistic tendencies going too far and harming Yūta. He was Sakaki's junior in high school.
 
 
 One of Shiho's bodyguards. He was Muranushi's classmate in elementary school and one of those who witnessed her smile. This causes him to be afraid to look in people's eyes. He also developed a crush on her.

Media

Manga
Working!! had its origins in a web comic written and illustrated by Karino Takatsu also called Working!!, which she published in irregular intervals on her personal website from 2002 to 2013. This web comic was published in print in six volumes from 2015 to 2017, under the title Web-ban Working!!. The web comic's setting and characters are different from the later four-panel comic strip manga, which began serialization in the January 2005 issue of Square Enix's Young Gangan manga magazine. While the restaurant in the web comic and manga are both called Wagnaria, they are different branch stores, so the world is the same. The author called the web comic version  and the serialized manga version . Square Enix published 13 tankōbon volumes between November 25, 2005 and December 25, 2014. Ten additional chapters have been released via mobile phones. The manga has been licensed for release in Chinese in Taiwan by Tong Li Publishing. Takatsu launched a biweekly web version of Working!! on October 16, 2009 to commemorate the anime series and posts the manga on the anime's official website.

Drama CDs and radio show
Square Enix released three drama CDs under the title Young Gangan Book In CD Working!!, with scenarios written by Shōgo Mukai. The first volume, released on January 25, 2007, came bundled with a 96-page booklet with bonus manga and the scenario included. The second and third volumes, released on April 25, 2008 and March 25, 2009 respectively, also came bundled with similar booklets. The voice acting cast for the anime is different from the drama CDs.

An Internet radio show to promote the anime series titled Yamaking!! aired 13 episodes between May 21 and October 29, 2010, and was hosted by Ryō Hirohashi, the voice actress of Aoi Yamada. The show restarted with the title Yamaking!! on October 7, 2011.

Anime

The anime television series' 13-episode first season, produced by A-1 Pictures and directed by Yoshimasa Hiraike, aired in Japan between April 4 and June 26, 2010 on Tokyo MX; the first episode having a special pre-broadcast on March 6, 2010 on Tokyo MX. NIS America licensed the anime under the title Wagnaria!!, and an English-subtitled DVD box set was released on March 24, 2011. The anime's opening theme is "Someone Else" by Kana Asumi, Saki Fujita and Eri Kitamura (the three female leads).

A second season, titled Working'!! (with an apostrophe), began airing on October 1, 2011, after a September 3, 2011 preview airing. Crunchyroll did a simulcast of the series.

A third anime season titled Working!!! premiered on July 4, 2015. It is also streamed online with English subtitles on Aniplex Channel, Crunchyroll, Hulu, Daisuki and Viewster. The third season's opening theme is "Now!!!

WWW.Working!!, an anime adaptation of Web-ban Working!!, the print release of the webcomic predecessor of the manga, premiered on October 1, 2016 on Tokyo MX and other television networks. A-1 Pictures and Yumi Kamakura returned to produce and direct the series, respectively. The opening theme song, titled "Eyecatch! Too Much!", is performed by Haruka Tomatsu, Yōko Hikasa and Sora Amamiya, while the ending theme song, titled "Mujūryoku Fever", is performed by Yūichi Nakamura, Kōki Uchiyama and Kenshō Ono. WWW.Working!! is licensed in North America by Aniplex of America.

Reception
The fourth manga volume of Working!! was the seventh highest-selling manga volume in Japan for the week of October 23–29, 2007. The sixth manga volume was the sixth-highest selling manga volume in Japan for the week of March 24–30, 2009, having sold over 73,000 volumes that week.

References

External links
Karino Takatsu's personal website 
Working!! at Square Enix 
Anime official website 
WWW.Working!! official website 

2005 manga
2010 Japanese television series endings
2011 Japanese television series endings
2015 Japanese television series endings
2016 Japanese television series endings
A-1 Pictures
Comedy anime and manga
Cross-dressing in anime and manga
Gangan Comics manga
Seinen manga
Slice of life anime and manga
Aniplex franchises
Square Enix franchises
Tokyo MX original programming
Yonkoma
Yomiuri Telecasting Corporation original programming
Television series set in restaurants
Anime and manga set in Hokkaido
Workplace comics
2010s workplace comedy television series